Kurt Ebelhäuser (Kurt Ebelhaeuser in English) is a German musician and record producer from Koblenz, probably best known for his work as guitarist for the indie rock band blackmail. He is also singer and guitarist for another indie rock band Scumbucket, which he formed in 1996. Both bands released several albums to high critical acclaim and toured extensively throughout Europe and Japan.

As a record producer he worked with bands such as Harmful (Sis Masis), Donots (Coma Chameleon and Lauter Als Bomben), Long Distance Calling (Avoid the Light), and Guano Apes (Offline). He is a founder of his own recording studio Tonstudio 45.

Discography
with blackmail
Blackmail (1997)
Science Fiction (1999)
Bliss, Please (2001)
Friend or Foe? (2003)
Kammerflimmern (Original Motion Picture Soundtrack) (2005)
Aerial View (2006)
Tempo Tempo (2008)
Anima Now! (2011)
II (2013)
with Scumbucket
Heliophobe (1997)	
Batuu (1998)		
Finistra (2000)	
Aficionados (2002)
Kiss Than Kind (2005)	
Heliophobia (2009)		
Sarsaparilla (2010)

References

External links

Living people
German male guitarists
Musicians from Koblenz
German rock guitarists
German record producers
Blackmail (band) members
Year of birth missing (living people)